Kuwait University (abbreviated as Kuniv) is a public university located in Kuwait City, Kuwait.

History
Kuwait University (KU), (in Arabic: جامعة الكويت), was established in October 1966 under Act N. 29/1966. The university was officially inaugurated on 27 November 1966 to include the College of Science, the College of Arts, the College of Education and the College for Women. The university is the state's first public institution of higher education and research.

The university aims to preserve and transmit knowledge through scholarship, and encourage innovation and development in the arts and the sciences. It comprises 17 colleges offering 76 undergraduate, 71 graduate programs.
 

The university facilities are spread over six campuses, offering programs in the sciences, engineering, humanities, medical and social sciences. Students are awarded Bachelor, Master and Doctoral degrees.

In November 2015, the university organised the Kuwait Global Technopreneurship Challenge (KGTC).

Campus

The six campuses that comprise the university are Adailiya, Shuwaikh, Keifan, Khaldiya, Fintas, and Jabriya. They are minutes away from downtown Kuwait City. The main access to the Shuwaikh campus, Jamal Abdul Nassar Street, overlooks the Arabian Gulf.

In 2019, the new 490-hectare (1,211-acre) Sabah Alsalem University City located in Shadadiyah was established for Kuwait University. It consolidate six different campuses currently dispersed throughout Kuwait City.

Organization and development
The university has seen its enrollment grow from about 418 to 40,000 students, faculty from 31 to 1,565, colleges from 4 to 17, and administrative and academic support personnel from 200 to more than 5,000. Kuwait University has more than 100,000 alumni serving the country and the region and some have attained prominent positions.
 

The strategic plan of the university is set by the government. Its executive powers are vested in the President, who heads the university, and is responsible for its scientific, intellectual, technical, administrative and financial affairs. The President oversees implementation of KU laws, bylaws and the University Council's decisions, and sustenance of institutional development through policies, plans and strategies geared to advancement.

The sphere of Presidential responsibilities finds expression in five core offices - Academics, Research, Health Sciences, Planning, and Academic Support Services, each headed by a vice president. Another executive office is the KU General Secretariat, an arm of the institutional administrative affairs, headed by the Secretary General, which together with the five Vice Presidents, constitute Kuwait University's senior leadership and executive authority.

Kuwait University academic system
Kuwait University follows the Credit Hour System (approved hours), with teaching arranged on semester basis, except in the Faculty of Law, which follows the yearly system of continuous teaching, and the Health Sciences Center's faculties.

Academic programs operate on a semester calendar beginning mid-September and finishing at the end of May.  Each semester lasts about 15 to 17 weeks. The fall semester commences the second week of September and lasts until the end of December. The spring semester commences at the end of January and lasts until the end of May. Enrollment in the summer program is optional. It lasts eight weeks including the examination period, as approved by the university.

Information resources
Kuwait University Libraries (KUL) information resources contain 526,000 titles/651,000 volumes of Arabic and non-Arabic monographs, reference materials, dissertations and reports. KUL subscribes to 76 databases and E-Books - contain 10,000 titles in various fields - 1645 printed journals (Arabic, non-Arabic) and 783 online journals (Arabic, non-Arabic). In addition, the audio-visual collection consists of approximately 20,000 items including 9800 scientific films, manuscripts collection consists of 1300 original and 22,000 copy. The library catalog (OPAC) includes bibliographic records for the Arabic and foreign books and periodicals of all disciplines.

Students admission process
The Admissions and Registration Deanship regulates the admission process, and is responsible for reviewing students’ applications and determining their admission, based on each program's requirements as established by the faculties and the University Council. The admissions decision is based on an aptitude test administered by the university 3 times a year. The Deanship oversees admitting students from other countries, and whether cultural scholarships will be awarded to them by the university; similarly, the Deanship also determines whether a degree will be awarded by the university.

Admission requirements
Admission is open to students who have successfully completed their secondary education and meet the requirements set forth by the university's admission policy. All admitted students choose the degree program they wish to join and the courses they wish to attend on a full-time basis. Students admitted to the College of Graduate Studies pursue their studies either on full- or part-time basis.

Admission requirements may require students to take an aptitude test prior to being accepted to a faculty; in such instances, admission is determined using the equivalent average system (combining the student's high school grade point average (GPA) with the results of the aptitude test) as a prerequisite for admission to the College of Engineering and Petroleum, Allied Health Sciences, Administrative Sciences, Health Science Center, Life Sciences, and Computing Science and Engineering, or through personalized interviews, as determined by the College of Law, and the College of Education.

Transfer of students
Students may transfer internally from one department or faculty to another; students not currently enrolled may formally apply to transfer from another university to Kuwait University.

Credit system
With the exception of the Faculty of Law, the Faculty of Medicine, and the Faculty of Dentistry, the university follows the credit system, which makes it mandatory for each student to complete a minimum number of credits to qualify for the award of a degree. Students have the option of selecting courses to fulfill their major sheet requirements.

Academic majors and minors
An academic major consists of a group of courses necessary for specialization in a given discipline. An academic minor consists of a number of courses that usually constitute a less demanding specialization, taken in addition to the major.

Graduation time and requirements
Normally it takes eight semesters for students to successfully complete their programs, and to qualify for graduation. However, for the Engineering and Petroleum program, the courses normally last for nine semesters, and for the Architecture program, 10 semesters. The Medical and Dentistry programs require seven years of study to qualify for graduation. The pharmacy program requires 5 years of study. Students are awarded their university degrees upon successfully completing the required credit units.

Honors system
Each faculty maintains a list of its honors students who achieve a grade point average of 3.5 and above. Students who finish their program's requirements within the prescribed period and graduate with a grade point average of 3.67 are awarded an honors degree in recognition of their  academic excellence.

Colleges
The university has 16 colleges housing academic departments in addition to the College of Graduate Studies which oversees the graduate programs. The colleges and departments are as follows:

IDK

Architecture 
 Department of Architecture
 Department of Visual Communication  and Interiors

Arts 
 Department of Arabic Language  and Literature
 Department of English Language  and Literature
 Department of French Language and Literature
 Department of History
 Department of Mass Communication
 Department of Philosophy

Business Administration 
 Department of Accounting
 Department of Economics
 Department of Finance  and Financial Institutions
 Department of Management  and Marketing
 Department of Public Administration
 Department of Information Systems and Operation Management

Dentistry 
 Department of Bioclinical Sciences
 Department of Developmental  and Preventive Sciences
 Department of Diagnostic Sciences
 Department of General Dentistry
 Department of Restorative Sciences
 Department of Surgical Science

Education 
 Department of Curriculum  and Teaching Methods
 Department of Educational Administration  and Planning
 Department of Educational Psychology
 Department of Foundations of Education
Department of biological sciences

Law 
 Department of International Law
 Department of Penal Law
 Department of Private Law
 Department of Public Law

Life Sciences 
 Department of Communication Science  and Languages
 Department of Environmental Technology Management
 Department of Food Science and Nutrition
 Department of Information Science

Medicine 
 Department of Anatomy
 Department of Community Medicine  and Behavioral Science
 Department of Medicine
 Department of Microbiology
 Department of Nuclear Medicine
 Department of Obstetrics  and Gynecology
 Department of Pathology
 Department of Pediatrics
 Department of Pharmacology
 Department of Physiology
 Department of Psychiatry
 Department of Radiology
 Department of Surgery

Pharmacy 
 Department of Pharmaceutical Chemistry
 Department of Pharmaceutics
 Department of Pharmacology  and Therapeutics
 Department of Pharmacy Practice

Public Health 
 Department of Environmental and Occupational Health
 Department of Epidemiology  and Biostatistics
 Department of Health Policy  and Management
 Department of Public Health Practice
 Department of Social  and Behavioral Sciences

Science 
 Department of Biological Sciences
 Department of Chemistry
 Department of Earth  and Environmental Sciences
 Department of Marine Sciences
 Department of Mathematics
 Department of Physics
 Department of Statistics and Operations Research
 Department of Computer Science

Sharia and Islamic Studies 
 Department of Belief, Invocation and Preaching Islam
 Department of Comparative Jurisprudence and Legitimate Policy
 Department of Jurisprudence and Rules
 Department of Qur'anic Interpretation and Prophetic Tradition (Hadith)

Social Sciences 
 Department of Geography
 Department of Information Studies 
 Department of Political Science
 Department of Psychology
 Department of Sociology and Social Work

College of Graduate Studies

See also 
 Education in Kuwait

References

External links
 بوابة الانترنت - كلية الحقوق - جامعة الكويت
 Kuwait University
 
 Health Sciences Center - Kuwait University
 College of Engineering & Petroleum
 اهلا ًبكم كلية التربية جامعة الكويت...
 كلية الشريعة و الدراسات الاسلامية
 College of Business Administration @ Kuwait University
 Kuwait Health Sciences Center
 Kuwait Health Sciences Center
 Health Sciences Center - Kuwait University   
 HTML code://see.css.kuniv.edu/
 Kuwait University
 Wayback Machine
 Kuwait University
 College of Computing Sciences & Engineering

Educational institutions established in 1966
1966 establishments in Kuwait